Felipe Alaiz de Pablo,  born on 23 May 1887 at Belver de Cinca (province of Huesca) and died on 8 April 1959 in Paris. He was a Spanish writer, translator, and journalist of the libertarian movement. He is considered to be the first openly anarchist Spanish writer.

Biography 
Felipe Alaiz studied in Lleida, Huesca, and Zaragoza. For two years he was the editor of the magazine La Revista de Aragón (Zaragoza, 1914). At a very young age, Felipe Alaiz devoted himself to militant journalism, an activity he followed all his life. He was a professor of literature at Liceo Escolar de Lérida, an avant-garde educational center founded by Federico Godàs Legido. That was where he met other young teachers, such as Joaquín Maurín and Víctor Colomer.

References

Spanish anarchists
Confederación Nacional del Trabajo members
Anarcho-syndicalists
Spanish trade unionists
20th-century Spanish writers
Exiles of the Spanish Civil War in France
1887 births
1959 deaths
20th-century Spanish journalists